Proroblemma testa is a species of moth in the family Erebidae. It was first described by William Barnes and James Halliday McDunnough in 1913 and it is found in North America.

The MONA or Hodges number for Proroblemma testa is 9080.

References

Further reading

 
 
 

Boletobiinae
Articles created by Qbugbot
Moths described in 1913